Events in the year 1948 in Japan.

Incumbents
Supreme Commander Allied Powers: Douglas MacArthur
Emperor: Hirohito
Prime Minister: Tetsu Katayama (S–Kanagawa) until March 10, Hitoshi Ashida (D–Kyōto) until October 15, Shigeru Yoshida (L–Kōchi, 2nd term, 1st under the Constitution of the State of Japan)
 Chief Cabinet Secretary: Suehiro Nishio (S–Ōsaka) until March 10, Gizō Tomabechi (D–Aomori) until October 15, Eisaku Satō (not Diet member) from October 17
 Chief Justice of the Supreme Court: Tadahiko Mibuchi
 President of the House of Representatives: Komakichi Matsuoka (S–Tokyo) until December 23
 President of the House of Councillors: Tsuneo Matsudaira (Ryokufūkai–Fukushima)
 Diet sessions: 2nd (regular session opened in December 1947, to July 5), 3rd (extraordinary, October 11 to November 30), 4th (regular, from December 1 to dissolution on December 23)

Governors
Aichi Prefecture: Hideo Aoyagi 
Akita Prefecture: Kosaku Hasuike 
Aomori Prefecture: Bunji Tsushima 
Chiba Prefecture: Tamenosuke Kawaguchi 
Ehime Prefecture: Juushin Aoki 
Fukui Prefecture: Harukazu Obata 
Fukuoka Prefecture: Katsuji Sugimoto 
Fukushima Prefecture: Kan'ichirō Ishihara 
Gifu Prefecture: Kamon Muto 
Gunma Prefecture: Shigeo Kitano (until 25 June); Yoshio Iyoku (starting 13 August)
Hiroshima Prefecture: Tsunei Kusunose 
Hokkaido Prefecture: Toshifumi Tanaka
Hyogo Prefecture: Yukio Kishida 
Ibaraki Prefecture: Yoji Tomosue 
Ishikawa Prefecture: Wakio Shibano 
Iwate Prefecture: Kenkichi Kokubun
Kagawa Prefecture: Keikichi Masuhara 
Kagoshima Prefecture: Kaku Shigenari 
Kanagawa Prefecture: Iwataro Uchiyama 
Kochi Prefecture: Wakaji Kawamura
Kumamoto Prefecture: Saburō Sakurai 
Kyoto Prefecture: Atsushi Kimura 
Mie Prefecture: Masaru Aoki
Miyagi Prefecture: Saburō Chiba 
Miyazaki Prefecture: Tadao Annaka 
Nagano Prefecture: Torao Hayashi 
Nagasaki Prefecture: Sōjirō Sugiyama 
Nara Prefecture: Mansaku Nomura 
Niigata Prefecture: Shohei Okada 
Oita Prefecture: Tokuju Hosoda 
Okayama Prefecture: Hirokichi Nishioka 
Osaka Prefecture: Bunzō Akama 
Saga Prefecture: Gen'ichi Okimori 
Saitama Prefecture: Mizo Nishimura 
Shiga Prefecture: Iwakichi Hattori 
Shiname Prefecture: Fujiro Hara 
Shizuoka Prefecture: Takeji Kobayashi 
Tochigi Prefecture: Juukichi Kodaira 
Tokushima Prefecture: Goro Abe 
Tokyo Prefecture: Seiichirō Yasui 
Tottori Prefecture: Aiji Nishio 
Toyama Prefecture: Tetsuji Tachi (until 15 November); Kunitake Takatsuji (starting 23 November)
Wakayama Prefecture: Shinji Ono 
Yamagata Prefecture: Michio Murayama 
Yamaguchi Prefecture: Tatsuo Tanaka 
Yamanashi Prefecture: Katsuyasu Yoshie

Events
January 1: The Nijūbashi Bridge, a well known double arched stone bridge located between the front and middle gates of the Imperial Palace, is opened to the public
January 4: International telephone service between the United States and Japan is established.
January 5: According to Japan Transport Ministry official confirmed report, when a commuter train was running, following to two passenger cars were derail with damage in Meitetsu Seto Line, Moriyama-ku, Nagoya, 36 persons were fatalities, 153 persons were wounded.
January 27 – According to Japan Coast Guard official confirmed report, a passenger ship Joou Maru toward from Osaka to Tadotsu, Kagawa Prefecture route, capsized by touch on landmine off north of Shōdo Island, Seto Inland Sea, 154 persons were official rescue confirmed, 199 passenger and crew were perished. 
February 9 – Fujitec was founded, as predecessor name was Fuji Transport Machinery Industry in Nishi-ku, Osaka.
March 9 – Yamazaki Baking founded in Ichikawa, Chiba Prefecture.
March 10: Hitoshi Ashida becomes prime minister
March 31: According to Japan Transport Ministry official confirmed report, an out of control device commuter train, collision with a standing commuter train in Kawachi-Hanazono Station, Kintetsu Nara Line, Kawachi (now Higashiosaka), Osaka Prefecture, 49 persons were human fatalities.
May 1: Japan Coast Guard founded.
June 28: 1948 Fukui earthquake
August 1: A first issue of Daily Sports published in Kobe.
September 17: According to Japanese government official document figures, a flooding river, levee collapse in around Kitakami River area by strong Typhoon Ione hit in northern Honshu, total 848 persons were lost to their lives with 1,956 persons were hurt.
September 24: Honda Motor Company founded.
October 5: Ashida cabinet resigns.
October 15: Shigeru Yoshida becomes prime minister for a second term.
November 1: Kataoka Electronic Company, later Alps Alpine was founded.
November 12: International Military Tribunal for the Far East hands down death sentences for 7 war criminals and imprisonment for 18 others.
December 7: Ashida arrested in connection with the Showa Electric scandal

Births
January 13: Shinji Sōmai, film director (died 2001)
January 18: Ryoko Moriyama, singer
January 24: Machiko Satonaka, manga writer
January 29: Mamoru Mori, astronaut
January 31: Muneo Suzuki, politician
February 13: Eizo Kenmotsu, gymnast
February 15: Seiji Oko, volleyball player
February 19: Kazuo Zaitsu, singer-songwriter 
March 8: Kiyomi Kato, wrestler
March 26: Ayumi Ishida, singer and actress
April 12: Tatsue Kaneda, enka singer 
April 16: Kazuyuki Sogabe, voice actor (died 2006)
May 15
 Yutaka Enatsu, former professional baseball pitcher 
 Kiyoshi Ueda, politician and former Saitama governor
May 26: Jyun Mayuzumi, singer  
June 8: Naomi Miyake, cognitive scientist (died 2015)
June 25: Kenji Sawada, singer
July 13: Chinatsu Nakayama, writer and former politician    
July 22: Toshio Tamogami, Air Self-Defense Force career military officer
August 8: Bibari Maeda, actress 
August 30: Yōsui Inoue, singer-songwriter 
October 20: Jun Maki, copywriter (died 2009)
November 3: Takashi Kawamura, politician and current Nagoya mayor 
November 12: Banjō Ginga, voice actor
November 15: Hiroe Yuki, badminton player (died 2011)
November 29: Yōichi Masuzoe, politician and former governor of Tokyo
December 6: Yoshihide Suga, incumbent Prime Minister of Japan
December 11: Shinji Tanimura, singer-songwriter
December 18: Yōichi Fukunaga, former jockey
Date unknown: Tetsuji Oda, electrical engineer and researcher

Deaths
March 6 – Kan Kikuchi, writer and novelist (b. 1888)
April 12 – Masaomi Yasuoka, lieutenant general (b. 1886)
April 17 – Kantarō Suzuki, admiral and former prime minister (b. 1868)
April 20 – Mitsumasa Yonai, admiral and former prime minister (b. 1880)
June 13 – Osamu Dazai, novelist (suicide) (b. 1909)
December 23 – Japanese war leaders (hanged):
Hideki Tōjō, general and former prime minister (b. 1884)
Seishirō Itagaki general (b. 1885)
Heitarō Kimura, general (b. 1888)
Kenji Doihara, general (b. 1883)
Kōki Hirota, diplomat and former prime minister (b. 1878)
Iwane Matsui, general (b. 1878)
Akira Mutō, general (b. 1892)

See also
 List of Japanese films of the 1940s

References

 
Years of the 20th century in Japan
1940s in Japan